Robert Kasperczyk (born 22 January 1967) is a Polish football manager and former footballer. He most recently was the manager of Podbeskidzie Bielsko-Biała.

He left Podbeskidzie Bielsko-Biała at the end of June 2021, after being relegated from 2020–21 Ekstraklasa and not having his contract extended. He served as head coach of the above-mentioned team from 22 December 2020.

References

External links
 

1967 births
Living people
Hutnik Nowa Huta players
Hutnik Nowa Huta managers
KSZO Ostrowiec Świętokrzyski managers
Podbeskidzie Bielsko-Biała managers
Polish footballers
Polish football managers
People from Tarnów County
Sportspeople from Lesser Poland Voivodeship
Association football forwards